MythBusters: The Search is a reality competition series that aired on the Science Channel. The series aimed to determine the hosts of a reboot of the Discovery Channel series MythBusters.

History
The original run of MythBusters concluded in 2016, after its original hosts Adam Savage and Jamie Hyneman confirmed in October 2015 that the then-upcoming season would be their 14th and final season. In late March 2016, it was revealed by Variety that Discovery Channel's sister network Science was planning a spin-off reality series, tentatively titled Search for the Next MythBusters, which would determine hosts for a revival of the series.

In September 2016, it was announced that Nerdist science editor Kyle Hill would host the series.

The revival, featuring the winners of The Search, premiered on Science in November 2017.

Show format
The series started with 10 contestants; in each episode, contestants compete in one team task (two or three teams competing) and one individual task. In each task, as in the original MythBusters series, the contestants are instructed to scientifically test the validity of a claim (with some tasks based on or expanding from myths covered by previous episodes of MythBusters). At the end of each episode, an MVP is declared, who is granted immunity from elimination. In most episodes, the worst-performing contestant was eliminated.

Contestants
 – Winner
 – Runner-up
 – MVP

Series overview

References

External links

 
2010s American reality television series
2017 American television series debuts
2017 American television series endings
2017 Australian television series debuts
2017 Australian television series endings
American educational television series
American non-fiction television series
American television spin-offs
Australian educational television series
Australian non-fiction television series
Australian television spin-offs
English-language television shows
Science Channel original programming
Television series about urban legends
Television shows set in San Francisco
Television shows filmed in California
Television shows filmed in New Jersey
Television series by Beyond Television Productions
Television in the San Francisco Bay Area
Engineering competitions